Would You Have Sex with an Arab? is a feature-length documentary film by French director Yolande Zauberman. It premiered at the 2011 Venice Film Festival, and released in France on 12 September 2012.

Overview
Shot in Israel, the film is an orchestration of interviews with people who all answer the same questions posed by the author – "Would you have sex with an Arab?" and "Would you have sex with an Israeli Jew?". Most, if not all of the scenes are shot at night in dance clubs, bars, cafes, public spaces, and personal homes in Tel Aviv, Israel. Interviews are conducted in French, Hebrew, Arabic, and English. The film is currently available with both French and English subtitles.

Location
Zauberman has said that she chose Tel Aviv as the site of her documentary because the city feels “guilty of nothing” and “has a certain blindness to it.” Zauberman said that in the past she sometimes “felt the incapacity to understand, to realize what happens in the rest of the country,” in Tel Aviv and “that is why there is a very special way of looking at Arabic [sic] people” in the city. Tel Aviv is Israel’s most socially progressive city, famous for its non-stop club scene. It is one of the most LGBT friendly cities in the world and has actively branded itself as a worldwide destination for gay and queer tourism.

Production
Zaumberman personally conducted interviews accompanied by two production crew carrying a light, a microphone, and an unobtrusive handheld camera. The crew spoke English, French, Hebrew and Arabic and thus were able to communicate with many of those interviewed in their native tongues; however, the majority of the interviews are conducted in English and Hebrew.

Dedication
The documentary is dedicated to Zauberman’s close friend Juliano Mer-Khamis, the Arab-Israeli actor, director, and political activist featured in the film.  Mer-Khamis was murdered in front of his “Theater of Freedom” in the Palestinian refugee camp of Jenin in the West Bank on April 4, 2011. He was shot five times by masked militants believed to be Muslim Palestinians.

Mer Khamis was born and raised in Nazareth. His mother, Arna Mer, was an Israeli Jewish activist for Palestinian rights. His father, Saliba Khamis, was a Christian Palestinian.

Awards
Would You Have Sex with an Arab? was selected at the 68th Venice International Film Festival in 2011.

References

2011 films
2011 in Israel
Documentary films about the Israeli–Palestinian conflict
Documentary films about sexuality
Films shot in Israel
Films set in Tel Aviv
2011 documentary films